Gamal Abdel Nasser (1918–1970) was president of Egypt from 1956 to 1970.

Nasser may also refer to:
 Nasser (name), a given name and surname
 Nasser, Egypt, a city in Beni Suef Governorate, Egypt
 Nasser City or Nasr City, a suburb of Cairo, Egypt
 Lake Nasser, a reservoir in Egypt and Sudan
 Nasser Club Bar Elias, a Lebanese association football club

See also 
 Al-Nasr (disambiguation)
 NASA (disambiguation)
 Naser (disambiguation)
 Nasir (name)
 Nasri, an Arabic name
 Nasr (disambiguation)
 Nasr (surname)
Nasser 56, 1996 Egyptian historical film